J0313–1806 is the most distant known quasar at z = 7.64. In January 2021, it was identified as the most redshifted (highest z) known quasar, with the oldest known supermassive black hole (SMBH) at  solar masses. The 2021 announcement paper described it as "the most massive SMBH at z > 7".

One of the 2021 paper authors, Feige Wang, said that the existence of a supermassive black hole so early in the existence of the Universe posed problems for the current theories of formation since "black holes created by the very first massive stars could not have grown this large in only a few hundred million years". The redshift z = 7.642 corresponds to an age of about 600 million years.

See also
Direct collapse black hole, a process by which black holes may form less than a few hundred million years after the Big Bang
 List of the most distant astronomical objects
 List of quasars
 PSO J172.3556+18.7734
 ULAS J1342+0928

References

Sources

Further reading

Astronomical objects discovered in 2021
Supermassive black holes
Quasars
Eridanus (constellation)